Speed the Memorial Best 1335days Dear Friends 2 was the last best album (Part 2) of the Japanese J-pop girlband Speed before their official breakup in March 2000. This album was released on March 29, 2000.

Track listing
"Back to the Street -リトルワールドへの想い-"
"All My True Love"
"Alive"
"Secret Eyes"
"Up to You !"
"Precious Time"
"Too Young (Millennium remix)"
"Breakin' Out to the Morning"
""
"Long Way Home: Single Version"
"Starting Over"
"Starting Over (reprise): Walk This Way"
"April: Theme of "Dear Friends""

Speed (Japanese band) albums
2000 greatest hits albums